Re-Main (stylized in all caps) is an original Japanese anime television series animated by MAPPA directed by Kiyoshi Matsuda, and written by Masafumi Nishida. The series aired from July to October 2021 on TV Asahi's  block.

Plot
During Winter of his third middle school year, water polo star Minato Kiyomizu got caught in an accident and has been in coma ever since. Exactly 203 days later, Minato regained his consciousness, but lost three years of his memories. Due to a certain reason, he decided to go back to water polo, but has no memories of his skill, let alone the sports' rules. Thus, Minato's efforts to catch up on what he has lost begins.

Characters

Yamanami High School

Minato was a water polo prodigy during his middle school days. During ninth grade, he made a bet with a fellow water polo athlete, Chinu Kawakubo, that if he could become Japan's top water polo athlete, she would go out with him. If Minato lost, he would pay eleven thousand yen (actually ten thousand, but with tax). Due to an accident, he ends up forgetting his memories of the past three years, including that of the bet and his water polo experience. After a chance encounter with Chinu, she offers him another chance: Minato has to go back to water polo and become Japan's top athlete or pay her double their original bet. He lives with his mother, father and little sister, Asumi who he's very close with. They run a small denim shop which doubles as their house.

Minato's junior in middle school who claims to know well about Minato. He's chasing Minato to his current high school just to see him in water polo again and is knowledgeable about the sport. It is revealed that past Minato barely knows him well; Eitarō lied and decided to quit the water polo club upon discovering that Minato isn't a water polo genius. After Minato convinced Eitarō that Minato is just a hard worker not a genius, Eitarō decided to continue water polo and supports Minato.

A third year student and the captain of Yamanami High's water polo club. He was the sole member until Minato and others joined.

Shūgo is a fast swimmer who started to swim to beat his older brother, who revealed to be Riku Momosaki. After Riku switched into water polo, Shūgo decided to stop anything related to swimming before Jō and others recruited him.

A mixed-race member who makes sweets. He joined the team after hearing Minato's speech about his memory loss and expectations people have about him, and feeling moved as a result.

A member who speaks in really small voice. He initially joined the club as a result of peer pressure from his boisterous classmates, but gradually warmed up to everyone, and gained self-confidence through his experiences in the team.

Shogakukan High School

Rikka Academy

Production and release
The series was announced on March 4, 2021. It was directed by Kiyoshi Matsuda, written by Masafumi Nishida, who also served as the chief director and sound director, with Kaori Futō providing the original character designs, Shiho Tanaka adapting the designs for animation, and music composed by Kana Utatane. It aired from July 4 to October 3, 2021 on TV Asahi's  block. Enhypen performed the series' opening theme song "Forget Me Not", while Shugo Nakamura performed the series' ending theme song "Kowareta Sekai no Byōshin wa". Funimation licensed the series. Medialink has licensed the series in Southeast Asia and South Asia, and is streaming it on their Ani-One YouTube channel, iQIYI, and Bilibili.

On September 24, 2021, Funimation announced that the series would receive an English dub, which premiered the following day. Following Sony's acquisition of Crunchyroll, the series was moved to Crunchyroll.

Episode list

Notes

References

External links
 

Anime with original screenplays
Crunchyroll anime
MAPPA
Medialink
NUManimation
TV Asahi original programming
Water polo in anime and manga